The 1180s BC is a decade which lasted from 1189 BC to 1180 BC.

Events and trends
 c. 1188 BC–Late Bronze Age collapse.
 1186 BC—End of the Nineteenth dynasty of Egypt, start of the Twentieth Dynasty.
 1184 BC—April 24, the traditional date of the fall of Troy.
 1182 BC—A desperate letter of Ammurapi, the last king of Ugarit, reporting the approaching fleet of the Peoples of the Sea. Shortly thereafter they destroyed both Ugarit and Alasiya (Cyprus).
 1181 BC—Menestheus, legendary King of Athens and veteran of the Trojan War, dies after a reign of 23 years and is succeeded by his nephew Demophon, a son of Theseus. Other accounts place his death a decade earlier and during the Trojan War (see 1190s BC).
 c. 1180 BC—Invaders raze Hattusa, causing the collapse of the Hittite Empire.

References